Avenionia roberti is a species of minute freshwater snail with a gill and an operculum, an aquatic gastropod mollusk or micromollusk in the family Hydrobiidae.

Distribution and conservation status
A. roberti occurs in Germany, where it is considered critically endangered (vom Aussterben bedroht), Belgium and the Netherlands.

Habitat and ecology 
A. roberti inhabits groundwaters in karst areas.

References

Hydrobiidae
Avenionia
Gastropods described in 1967